Meadow Creek is an unincorporated community in Summers County, West Virginia, United States. Meadow Creek is located on the New River, southwest of Meadow Bridge and north of Hinton.

The community was named after nearby Meadow Creek.
Meadow Creek Baptist Church, est October 21, 1878.  
The Sewell Valley Bank opened November 4. 1918 and closed in May of 1932. It was liquidated to the First National Bank of Hinton.

References

Unincorporated communities in Summers County, West Virginia
Unincorporated communities in West Virginia
New River Gorge National Park and Preserve